Taing Bunchhai (born 28 December 2002) is a Cambodian footballer currently playing as a defender for Boeung Ket in the Cambodian Premier League, and the Cambodia national team.

References

External links
 

2002 births
Living people
Cambodian footballers
Cambodia international footballers
People from Phnom Penh
Association football defenders
Competitors at the 2021 Southeast Asian Games
Southeast Asian Games competitors for Cambodia